This is a list of Polish television related events from 2005.

Events
4 June - The Co za tydzień? presenter Olivier Janiak and his partner Kamila Kajak win the first series of Taniec z Gwiazdami.
11 June - Maciej Silski wins the fourth and final series of Idol.
4 December - M jak miłość actress Katarzyna Cichopek and her partner Marcin Hakiel win the second series of Taniec z Gwiazdami.

Debuts
16 April - Taniec z gwiazdami (2005-2011, 2014-present)
3 September - Dzień Dobry TVN (2005-present)

Television shows

1990s
Klan (1997-present)

2000s
M jak miłość (2000-present)
Na Wspólnej (2003-present)
Pensjonat pod Różą (2004-2006)
Pierwsza miłość (2004-present)

Ending this year
Idol (2002-2005)

Births

Deaths